Pavel Andreyevich Safronov (born 13 February 1989) is a Russian former professional football player.

Club career
He played two seasons in the Russian Football National League for FC Volgar Astrakhan and FC KAMAZ Naberezhnye Chelny.

Honours
Russian Second Division Zone South best player: 2010.
Russian Second Division Zone South best scorer: 2010 (16 goals).

External links
 
 

1989 births
Living people
Russian footballers
Association football forwards
FC Lada-Tolyatti players
FC Torpedo Moscow players
FC Volgar Astrakhan players
FC Zenit-Izhevsk players
FC KAMAZ Naberezhnye Chelny players
FC Mashuk-KMV Pyatigorsk players
Sportspeople from Tolyatti